Markku Kalevi Rossi (born 5 March 1956) is a Finnish politician from the Centre Party. He was a representative in the Parliament of Finland from 1991 to 1995, briefly in 1999 and from 2000 to 2019. He has stated that he wouldn't seek another term in the 2019 elections.

Rossi was born in Suonenjoki. He married Matti Kaarlejärvi in March 2017, being among the first same-sex couples to marry under the legislation change in Finland. They had lived together in a registered partnership since December 2015.

References

External links
 Home page of Markku Rossi

1956 births
Living people
Centre Party (Finland) politicians
Members of the Parliament of Finland (1991–95)
Members of the Parliament of Finland (1999–2003)
Members of the Parliament of Finland (2003–07)
Members of the Parliament of Finland (2007–11)
Members of the Parliament of Finland (2011–15)
Members of the Parliament of Finland (2015–19)
People from Suonenjoki
Gay politicians
Finnish LGBT politicians
LGBT legislators